The Order of Righteous Son of Sudan or Order of the Loyal son of the Sudan is a state decoration of Sudan established on 16 November 1961 and given to male Sudan citizens who protected the Republic's interests, particularly its foreign and domestic policy and to defend its sacrificing their lives or endangering them in order to uphold the status of the Democratic Republic of Sudan. The Order can be granted more than once. 

It is not permissible to repeat awarding of decorations and medals, or to rise from one class to a higher one, except after the lapse of at least three years from the date of awarding them. This period is reduced to one year for employees if they are referred to retirement. Orders and medals remain the property of the awardee, and their heirs as a souvenir without any of them having the right to carry it. Without prejudice to any other punishment stipulated in the laws of Sudan, it is permissible, by order of the President of the Republic, to strip the bearer of a necklace, sash, medal, medallion, cloak of honour, or belt if they commit an act that is dishonourable or inconsistent with loyalty to the state.

Privileges 
The holder of this medal shall have the following privileges:

 Be invited to attend national celebrations.
 Meet the President of the Republic, their deputies and the ministers.
 If necessary, the competent authorities shall facilitate his medical treatment inside and outside Sudan.
 It is not permissible to arrest or arrest him in cases other than flagrante delicto, except with the permission of the President of the Republic.

Insignia 
The Order consists of a medal of silver plated with gold water and three identical surfaces. The first is an eight-pointed star bearing the emblem of the Democratic Republic of Sudan. The second is a circle with a diameter of 40 millimetres in the middle of the first surface, and on its outskirts is a sword and a bough. The olive tree, the flag of the Republic, and the phrase "the Righteous Son of Sudan" in arabic, i.e., . The third is a star with eight-pointed sloping sides. The decoration hangs from a ribbon of shiny, corrugated silk of green colour, its width is 17 millimetres, and it has two margins on the sides of the colours black, white, and red, respectively, each width is 2.5 millimetres, and it is worn on the chest on the left side. 

A miniature medal of silver accompanies this medal with gold water. It bears the same specifications as the larger medal, reduced to one-third in dimensions, except for the ribbon, which is reduced to half and worn over the military's diaries.

Notable recipients 

 2017 Ahmed Abdel-Rahman
 2019 Ahmed Haroun
 2019 Abdel Rahman Swar al-Dahab
 Abdel Halim Mohamed
 
 Ashrf Seed Ahmed
 Khalil Othman, but the Order was taken away by President Jaafar Nimeiry
 Siddig "Wada" Adam Abdallah
 Al-Dhau Hajouj
 Awad al-Jazz
 Kamal Abusen
 Abdullah Saeed Bawareth and Abdul Rahman Bawarath, who are Saudis who was given the Sudanese citizenship just before being honoured)

References 

Orders, decorations, and medals of Sudan
Awards established in 1961